Picharagardha is a farming village in the eastern state of Andhra Pradesh, India. It is home to around five hundred families growing ginger, watermelon and wheat.

References

Villages in Ranga Reddy district